This article lists important figures and events in the public affairs of British Malaya during the year 1937, together with births and deaths of prominent Malayans.

Incumbent political figures

Central level 
 Governor of Federated of Malay States :
 Shenton Whitelegge Thomas
 Federal Secretary of the Federated of Malay States :
 Christopher Dominic Ahearne
 Governor of Straits Settlements :
 Shenton Whitelegge Thomas

State level 
  Perlis :
 Raja of Perlis : Syed Alwi Syed Saffi Jamalullail
  Johore :
 Sultan of Johor : Sultan Ibrahim Al-Masyhur
  Kedah :
 Sultan of Kedah : Abdul Hamid Halim Shah
  Kelantan :
 Sultan of Kelantan : Sultan Ismail Sultan Muhammad IV
  Trengganu :
 Sultan of Trengganu : Sulaiman Badrul Alam Shah
  Selangor :
 British Residents of Selangor :
 Theodore Samuel Adams (until unknown date)
 Stanley Wilson Jones (from unknown date)
 Sultan of Selangor :
 Sultan Sir Alaeddin Sulaiman Shah (until unknown date)
 Sultan Sir Hishamuddin Alam Shah Al-Haj (from unknown date)
  Penang :
 Monarchs : King George VI
 Residents-Councillors :  Arthur Mitchell Goodman
  Malacca :
 Monarchs : King George VI
 Residents-Councillors :
  Negri Sembilan :
 British Residents of Negri Sembilan :
 John Whitehouse Ward Hughes (until unknown date)
 Gordon Lupton Ham (from unknown date)
 Yang di-Pertuan Besar of Negri Sembilan : Tuanku Abdul Rahman ibni Almarhum Tuanku Muhammad 
   Pahang :
 British Residents of Pahang : C. C. Brown
 Sultan of Pahang : Sultan Abu Bakar
  Perak :
 British Residents of Perak : G. E. Cater
 Sultan of Perak : Sultan Iskandar Shah

Events 
 1 April – Ma'ahad Muhammadi Lelaki established.
 Unknown date – Construction of Central Market, Kuala Lumpur completed.

Births
 13 March – Fadzil Mohd Noor – Politician (died 2002)
 28 March – Khoo Kay Kim – Historian
 13 April – Tengku Razaleigh Hamzah – Politician
 5 May – Hussein Abu Hassan – Actor (died 2007)
 23 June – Kamaruzzaman bin Abdul Kadir – Writer (died 2005)
 4 July – Abdullah Ahmad – Journalist
 10 August – Saadiah – Actress (died 2005)
 14 September – Abu Zahar bin Haji Isnin – Politician (died 2013)
 30 October – Asaari Muhammad – Founder Al-Arqam (died 2010)
 1 December – Mohd Zin Abdul Ghani – Politician (died 1997)
 29 December – Mohd Khalil Yaakob – Politician
 Unknown date – Fadzil Mahmood – Politician
 Unknown date – Karim Latiff – Actor (died 2015)

Deaths

See also
 1937
 1936 in Malaya
 1938 in Malaya
 History of Malaysia

References

1930s in British Malaya
Malaya